Pat Callinan's 4x4 Adventures is an Australian Adventure television series airs on Network Ten on 11 October 2008 later on One since 2009. Pat Callinan visits iconic 4x4 destinations in Australia in his "trusty" Volkswagen Amarok.

See also 
 4WD 24/7
 Overlanding
 Off-roading

External links 
 Official Website
 Official Website Network 10

Network 10 original programming
10 Bold original programming
Australian non-fiction television series
2008 Australian television series debuts